Eklutna (Dena'ina: Idlughet; Ahtna: Zdlaaygha) is a native village within the Municipality of Anchorage in the U.S. state of Alaska. The Tribal Council estimates the population at 70; many tribal members live in the surrounding communities.

About

The Dena'ina Athabascan village of Eklutna is the last of eight villages that existed before construction of the Alaska Railroad brought an influx of American colonists around 1915. First settled more than 800 years ago, it is the oldest inhabited location in the Anchorage area.
Its Dena'ina name is Idlughet  ("by the objects", referring to two nearby hills); the name "Eklutna" derives from Idluytnu, the name for Eklutna River, meaning "(plural) objects river".

Russian Orthodox missionaries arrived in the 1840s. The melding of Orthodox Christianity and native practices resulted in the brightly colored spirit houses which can be seen at the Eklutna Cemetery, in use since 1650 and now a historical park. The cemetery is probably the most photographed graveyard in Alaska, overshadowing other features of the village.

An Alaska Railroad siding and station house were built near the village Eklutna in 1918. The federal government operated a boarding school for native children near the village before World War II. The U.S. Army established a facility nearby in the mid-20th century; it is now gone.

In 2014, a 160-acre homestead acquired in 1924 was donated to the Native Village of Dena’ina Athabascan country, where Alaska Native people have lived for thousands of years. For the most part, the land has remained untouched — and under a conservation easement, it will be maintained as a refuge for wildlife and protected from real estate development.

Virtually all residents of the Eklutna Village are either Alaska Native or part Native; most are members of the federally recognized Native Village of Eklutna. For employment, most Tribal Members commute to work in Anchorage, nearby Eagle River, or the Matanuska-Susitna Valley.

Demographics

Eklutna first appeared on the 1930 U.S. Census as an unincorporated village. Of its 158 residents, 61 were Native, 49 were Creole (Mixed Russian & Native), 47 were White, and 1 was Asian. It continued to report on the census until 1970 and was annexed into Anchorage in 1975.

Education
Anchorage School District operates area public schools.

See also
Eklutna Annie, a known but unidentified victim of serial killer Robert Hansen, found in 1980

References

Further reading

External links
 Alaska Division of Community Advocacy - Community Information Summary 
 Eklutna, Inc. (ANCSA village corporation)
 Native Village of Eklutna

Anchorage metropolitan area
Denaʼina
Neighborhoods in Anchorage, Alaska